The 1978 European Athletics Indoor Championships were held at Palasport di San Siro in Milan, Italy, between 11–12 March 1978. It was the first time the championships were held in Italy.

Medal summary

Men

Women

Medal table

Participating nations

 (4)
 (6)
 (13)
 (11)
 (14)
 (10)
 (18)
 (10)
 (2)
 (8)
 (3)
 (29)
 (1)
 (7)
 (2)
 (22)
 (1)
 (6)
 (31)
 (7)
 (6)
 (6)
 (3)
 (26)
 (6)

References
 Results - men at GBRathletics.com
 Results - women at GBRathletics.com
 EAA

 
1978
European Indoor Championships
Sports competitions in Milan
European Indoor Championships,1978
March 1978 sports events in Europe
1978,Athletics,European Indoor Championships